Seborrheic-like psoriasis  is a skin condition characterized by psoriasis with an overlapping seborrheic dermatitis.

See also
 Psoriasis
 Skin lesion
 List of cutaneous conditions

References

 

Psoriasis